Romantic Style Parte 3: Desde La Esencia is the third studio album by Panamian singer-songwriter Flex. It was released on March 30, 2010 through EMI Latin. The album was preceded by the title single "Besos de Amor" which it features Kumbia All Starz's member Ricky Rick.

Track list

Chart performance
The album debuted at number 25 on the Billboard Top Latin Albums, becoming his lowest debut on the U.S. charts compared to his previous albums, the next week, the album climbed 5 places to number 20.

References

External links
Official website

2010 albums
Flex (singer) albums
Spanish-language albums
EMI Records albums